The 2007–08 ISU Junior Grand Prix was the 11th season of the ISU Junior Grand Prix, a series of international junior level competitions organized by the International Skating Union. It was the Junior-level complement to the 2007–08 ISU Grand Prix of Figure Skating, which is for Senior-level skaters. Skaters competed in the disciplines of men's singles, ladies' singles, pair skating, and ice dance. The top skaters from the series met at the Junior Grand Prix Final.

Competitions
The locations of the JGP events change yearly. In the 2007–08 season, the series was composed of the following events:

Series notes
Pairs champions Vera Bazarova / Yuri Larionov were later retroactively disqualified from the Junior Grand Prix Final due to a positive test on a doping sample which Larionov gave before that competition. All other teams consequently moved up one spot. This change caused fourth-place finishers Jessica Rose Paetsch / Jon Nuss to earn a spot on the podium at the Final.

Qualifying
Skaters who reached the age of 13 by July 1, 2007 but had not turned 19 (singles and females of the other two disciplines) or 21 (male pair skaters and ice dancers) were eligible to compete on the junior circuit. Unlike the senior ISU Grand Prix of Figure Skating, skaters for the Junior Grand Prix are entered by their national federations rather than seeded by the ISU. The number of entries allotted to each ISU member federation is determined by their skaters' placements at the previous season's World Junior Figure Skating Championships in each respective discipline.

For the 2007–08 season, in singles, the five best placed member nations at the 2007 World Junior Figure Skating Championships could enter two skaters in all eight events. Member nations who placed sixth through tenth could enter one skater in all eight events. Member nations with a skater who had qualified for the free skate at Junior Worlds may enter one skater in seven of the events. Member nations who did not qualify for the free skate but placed 25th through 30th in the short program could enter one skater in six of the events. All other nations could enter one skater in five of the events.

In pair skating, member nations could enter up to three teams per event. The host nation is allowed to enter as many pair teams as it wishes. Pairs were contested at four events out of eight.

In ice dance, member nations could enter one dance team per event. Member nations who placed in the top five at the 2007 Junior Worlds could enter a second dance team.

The host country was allowed to enter up to three skaters or teams in singles and dance in their event, and there were no limit to the number of pairs teams.

Prize money
The total prize money for the Junior Grand Prix events in the 2007/2008 season was $22,500. Pairs and dance teams split the money:

The total prize money for the Junior Grand Prix Final in the 2007–2008 season was $105,000. Pairs and dance teams split the money:

Junior Grand Prix Final qualifiers
The following skaters qualified for the Junior Grand Prix Final, in order of qualification.

Pair skaters Krystyna Klimczak / Janusz Karweta were given the host wildcard spot to the Junior Grand Prix Final.

Medalists

Men

Ladies

Pairs

†Bazarova / Larionov were later disqualified from the competition due to a positive doping sample from Larionov.

Ice dance

Medals table

References

External links

 
 
 
 
 
 
 
 
 
 
 2007–08 Results

ISU Junior Grand Prix
Junior Grand Prix
2007 in youth sport
2008 in youth sport